Corintascaris ferreirae is a species of beetle in the family Carabidae, the only species in the genus Corintascaris.

References

Scaritinae